Gelsenkirchen is an electoral constituency (German: Wahlkreis) represented in the Bundestag. It elects one member via first-past-the-post voting. Under the current constituency numbering system, it is designated as constituency 123. It is located in the Ruhr region of North Rhine-Westphalia, comprising the city of Gelsenkirchen.

Gelsenkirchen was created for the inaugural 1949 federal election. Since 2017, it has been represented by Markus Töns of the Social Democratic Party (SPD).

Geography
Gelsenkirchen is located in the Ruhr region of North Rhine-Westphalia. As of the 2021 federal election, it is coterminous with the independent city of Gelsenkirchen.

History
Gelsenkirchen was created in 1949. From 1965 through 1998, it was named Gelsenkirchen I. It acquired its current name in the 2002 election. In the 1949 election, it was North Rhine-Westphalia constituency 40 in the numbering system. From 1953 through 1961, it was number 99. From 1965 through 1976, it was number 97. From 1980 through 1998, it was number 93. From 2002 through 2009, it was number 124. Since 2013, it has been number 123.

Originally, the constituency was coterminous with the city of Gelsenkirchen. From 1965 through 1976, it comprised the Stadtteile of Hassel, Buer, Horst, Heßler, and Rotthausen. From 1980 through 1998, it comprised the Stadtbezirke of Mitte, West, and Süd. Since the 2002 election, it has again been coterminous with the city of Gelsenkirchen.

Members
The constituency has been held continuously by the Social Democratic Party (SPD) since its creation. It was first represented by Robert Geritzmann from 1949 to 1961, followed by Walter Arendt for a single term. Josef Löbbert was elected at the 1965 federal election and served three terms. Heinz Menzel then served one term from 1976 to 1980. Joachim Poß was representative from 1980 to 2017, a total of ten consecutive terms. Markus Töns succeeded him in the 2017 election. He was re-elected in 2021.

Election results

2021 election

2017 election

2013 election

2009 election

References

Federal electoral districts in North Rhine-Westphalia
1949 establishments in West Germany
Constituencies established in 1949
Gelsenkirchen